Polygonum sawatchense is a North American species of plants in the buckwheat family. It in the western United States and western Canada, from the Pacific Coast to the western Great Plains, so from British Columbia south to California and east as far as New Mexico, Colorado, Saskatchewan, and the Dakotas.

Flowers are green, red, or white, in elongated arrays.

Species is named for the Sawatch Range in Colorado, where Brandegee collected the type specimen.>

Subspecies
Polygonum sawatchense subsp. oblivium Costea & Tardif - British Columbia, Washington, Oregon, California, Idaho, Nevada
Polygonum sawatchense subsp. sawatchense - from Alberta + Saskatchewan south to Arizona + New Mexico

References

sawatchense
Flora of Western Canada
Flora of the Western United States
Flora of California
Flora of the Rocky Mountains
Flora of the Sierra Nevada (United States)
Plants described in 1893
Flora without expected TNC conservation status